Andrei Andreyevich Eshpai (born 18 April 1956, Moscow, Russia) is a (Russian and Soviet) film director, screenwriter and producer of Mari descent.

Biography 
He is the son of the composer Andrei Yakovlevich Eshpai, and the grandson of the composer Yakov Andreyevich Eshpai. He has a wife – actress Yevgeniya Simonova, a daughter – Mariya Eshpai and stepdaughter – actress Zoya Kaidanovskaya (daughter of Yevgeniya Simonova and her first husband – actor Aleksandr Kaidanovsky).

He studied at the Moscow State Institute of Culture in 1975-76 graduated from the Gerasimov Institute of Cinematography in 1980.

Filmography
 1983 – When Was Played Music of Bakh
 1988 – The Buffoon
 1988 – The Jester
 1991 – Humiliated and Insulted
 2001 – Flowering Hill Among Bossom Field
 2004 – Children of the Arbat
 2006 – Ellipsis
 2009 – Ivan the Terrible

External links

1956 births
Living people
Mass media people from Moscow
Mari people
Soviet film directors
Russian film directors
Gerasimov Institute of Cinematography alumni